Uchenna Nwosu (born December 28, 1996) is an American football outside linebacker for the Seattle Seahawks of the National Football League (NFL).  He played college football at USC, and was drafted by the Los Angeles Chargers in the second round with the 48th overall pick of the 2018 NFL Draft.

College career
Nwosu attended and played college football at USC under head coaches Steve Sarkisian and Clay Helton. After playing in 12 games during his freshman season, Nwosu was not able to participate in the 2014 Holiday Bowl due to unspecified team rules violations.  It was later reported that Nwosu did not enroll in the following spring semester.  Despite speculation that he may leave the team, Nwosu was able to take summer classes and rejoin the team for the 2015 season.  After his senior season at USC, Nwosu was named a co-MVP of USC along with quarterback Sam Darnold.  He was also on the watchlist for the Butkus Award. Following his senior season, he participated in the 2018 Senior Bowl.

Professional career

The Los Angeles Chargers selected Nwosu in the second round (48th overall) of the 2018 NFL Draft. Nwosu was the sixth linebacker drafted in 2018. He played in his hometown of Carson at the temporary home of the Chargers at the StubHub Center.

Los Angeles Chargers
On May 13, 2018, the Los Angeles Chargers signed Nwosu to a four-year, $5.75 million contract that includes $3.01 million guaranteed and a signing bonus of $2.26 million.

Nwosu entered training camp slated as a backup outside linebacker. Head coach Anthony Lynn named Nwosu the backup strongside linebacker to start the regular season, behind veteran Kyle Emanuel.

He made his professional regular season debut in the Los Angeles Chargers’ season-opening 38-28 loss to the Kansas City Chiefs. On September 16, 2018, Nwosu recorded three combined tackles and made his first career sack during a 31–20 victory at the Buffalo Bills in Week 2. Nwosu made his first career sack on Bills’ quarterback Josh Allen for a three-yard loss in the first quarter.

As the Chargers made the playoffs, they faced off against the Baltimore Ravens in the Wild Card round. Nwosu made a critical play at the end of the game, forcing Ravens quarterback Lamar Jackson to fumble on what would have otherwise been a potential game winning drive for the Ravens. The Chargers recovered the fumble, sealing a 23–17 win to advance to the Divisional round.

Nwosu finished the 2019 season with 31 tackles, two sacks, and three passes defensed.

In 2020, Nwosu played in 13 games with four starts, recording 4.5 sacks, 33 tackles, and two passes defensed. He was placed on injured reserve on December 26, 2020.

Seattle Seahawks
On March 17, 2022, Nwosu signed a two-year contract with the Seattle Seahawks.

In Week 1, Nwosu recorded seven tackles, a sack, and a forced fumble in a 17-16 win over the Denver Broncos. He was awarded NFC Defensive Player Of The Week for his performance. In his first year with the Seahawks, he recorded career highs in both total tackles and sacks.

Personal life
He is of Nigerian descent.

References

External links

Los Angeles Chargers bio
USC Trojans bio

1996 births
Living people
American sportspeople of Nigerian descent
American football outside linebackers
Los Angeles Chargers players
People from Carson, California
Players of American football from California
Seattle Seahawks players
Sportspeople from Los Angeles County, California
USC Trojans football players